Russell Bassett (October 24, 1845 – May 8, 1918) was an American stage and film actor. He appeared in 76 silent films between 1911 and 1918. 

Bassett was born in Milwaukee, Wisconsin, but he moved to Oakland, California at age 3 when his father became a miner. He attended the now-defunct Brayton College in Oakland, and that was where he gained his initial acting experience.

Bassett gained early acting experience in stock theater with the Hooley Stock Company in Chicago. Later, he "toured the whole width of America, broadening, mellowing, polishing off his art." On Broadway, he appeared in The Other Fellow (1910), The Top o' th' World (1907), and Rip Van Winkle (1905).

During his film career, Bassett acted for the Biograph, Edison, Yankee, Pathe, Imp, Reliance, Nestor, and Famous Players companies. 

On May 8, 1918, Bassett died from a cerebral hemorrhage at his home in New York City. He was survived by his wife and a son.

Selected filmography

When the Heart Calls (1912)
Almost a Rescue (1913)
The Eagle's Mate (1914)
Such a Little Queen (1914)
Behind the Scenes (1914)
The Morals of Marcus (1915)
David Harum (1915)
Fanchon the Cricket (1915)
Jim the Penman (1915)
May Blossom (1915)
Little Pal (1915)
Sold (1915)
Nearly a King (1916)
Diplomacy (1916)
Hulda from Holland (1916)
Less Than the Dust (1916)
Little Lady Eileen (1916)
A Coney Island Princess (1916)
 The Honeymoon (1917)
 Public Be Damned (1917)
Broadway Jones (1917)
Seven Keys to Baldpate (1917)
Hit-The-Trail Holliday (1918)

References

External links

1845 births
1918 deaths
Male actors from Milwaukee
American male film actors
American male silent film actors
20th-century American male actors